The 2022 Sparkassen ATP Challenger was a professional tennis tournament played on indoor hard courts in Ortisei, Italy between 24 and 30 October 2022. It was the 13th edition of the tournament and was part of the 2022 ATP Challenger Tour.

Singles main-draw entrants

Seeds

 1 Rankings are as of 17 October 2022.

Other entrants
The following players received wildcards into the singles main draw:
  Federico Arnaboldi
  Luca Nardi
  Stefano Travaglia

The following players received entry into the singles main draw as alternates:
  Mirza Bašić
  Mattia Bellucci
  Lorenzo Giustino

The following players received entry from the qualifying draw:
  Térence Atmane
  Alibek Kachmazov
  Evgeny Karlovskiy
  Sandro Kopp
  Petr Nouza
  Andrew Paulson

The following player received entry as a lucky loser:
  Marius Copil

Champions

Singles

 Borna Gojo def.  Lukáš Klein 7–6(7–4), 6–3.

Doubles

 Denis Istomin /  Evgeny Karlovskiy def.  Marco Bortolotti /  Sergio Martos Gornés 6–3, 7–5.

References

2022 ATP Challenger Tour
2022
2022 in Italian tennis
October 2022 sports events in Italy